Mount Olivet Presbyterian Church is a historic Presbyterian church located near Winnsboro, Fairfield County, South Carolina.  It was built in 1869, and is a one-story, rectangular, front-gabled stuccoed brick building. The stucco is scored to resemble cut stone and the church sits on a granite foundation. The large cemetery northwest of the church contains several historically and artistically significant gravestones dating back to 1795 and is enclosed by a cast-iron fence.

It was added to the National Register of Historic Places in 1986.

References

Presbyterian churches in South Carolina
Churches on the National Register of Historic Places in South Carolina
Churches completed in 1869
19th-century Presbyterian church buildings in the United States
Churches in Fairfield County, South Carolina
National Register of Historic Places in Fairfield County, South Carolina
1869 establishments in South Carolina